John Hinde may refer to:

 John Hinde (broadcaster) (1911–2006), Australian broadcaster
 John Hinde (photographer) (1916–1997), English photographer
 John Hinde (rowing) (1928–2017), English coxswain
 John Hinde Palmer (1808–1884), English barrister and Liberal Party politician

See also

 John Hind (disambiguation)